Engesa – Engenheiros Especializados S/A was a Brazilian company in the agriculture and defense sectors that specialized in producing tactical military trucks, armored fighting vehicles, and civilian Sport utility vehicles.

Engesa began as a private company in 1963, fitting all-wheel-drive systems into existing commercial trucks. It also rebuilt, adapted, and updated obsolete armoured vehicles and tanks that had been sold or given to the Brazilian Army during and after World War II.

Engesa's first headquarters were in Avenida Liberdade, São Paulo. In 1975, the company moved its headquarters to Avenida Das Nações Unidas, and in 1985, to Barueri. However, its main production facility was in São José dos Campos.

Engesa headed a group of Brazilian companies, operating in various economic sectors and exporting to 37 countries, that included Engesa Electronics (a Brazilian subsidiary of Philips) and FNV (Fábrica Nacional de Vagões or National Rail Car Factory). Research and development for the group was provided by the company Engepeq. In the 1980s, Engesa employed over 5,000 people, and by 1993 had produced over 3,300 armoured vehicles for the Brazilian military and export worldwide.

Engesa was declared bankrupt in October 1993. The company's problems had begun with the loss of $200 million in Iraq and the failure of sales of its EE-T1 Osório tank in which it had invested its complete budget. In 2001, the company's factory in São José dos Campos was sold to Embraer.

Production vehicles
 Reconnaissance vehicle: EE-3 Jararaca;
 Armored car: EE-9 Cascavel, It was well used in Iraqi Armed forces during the Iraq-Iran war from 1980–1988 and was used heavily in the Gulf War, it is still in service with Iraq, Zimbabwe, and a number of South American armies,
 Armored personnel carrier: EE-11 Urutu, It was well used in Iraqi Armed forces during the Iraq-Iran war from 1980–1988 and the subsequent Gulf conflict,
 Trucks: EE-15, EE-25, and EE-50,
 Light Vehicles: EE-4, EE-12 and EE-34,
  Air-portable Armored Vehicle: EE-T4 Ogum,
 Tank destroyers: EE-17 Sucuri I and EE-18 Sucuri II,
 Main battle tank: EE-T1 Osório.

References

Defunct motor vehicle manufacturers of Brazil
Defunct defence companies of Brazil
Companies based in São Paulo (state)
Organisations based in São José dos Campos